The 2006 Pacific Life Holiday Bowl was a college football bowl game played December 28, 2006 in San Diego, California. It was part of the 2006 NCAA Division I FBS football season and one of 32 games in the 2006–07 bowl season. It featured the Texas A&M Aggies representing the Big 12 against the California Golden Bears from the Pac-10. In the Golden Bears' second trip to the Holiday Bowl in three years, they routed the Aggies, 45–10. Each conference received $2.2 million for the teams playing.

Game summary

Scoring Summary

Source:

Statistics

References

Holiday Bowl
Holiday Bowl
California Golden Bears football bowl games
Texas A&M Aggies football bowl games
Holiday Bowl
December 2006 sports events in the United States